Vehkala railway station is a Helsinki commuter rail station located in the district of Myllymäki in Vantaa, Finland.

It is one of the new stations of the Ring Rail Line (Kehärata), which opened in July 2015. The station is located between the stations of Vantaankoski and Kivistö.

References

External links 
 

Railway stations in Vantaa
Railway stations opened in 2015
2015 establishments in Finland